The USCGC White Alder (WLM/WAGL-541) was the former Navy lighter, YF-417.  The United States Coast Guard acquired a total of eight of these former Navy YF-257-class lighters between 1947-1948 for conversion to coastal buoy tenders.  They were needed to complement the larger seagoing buoy tenders in servicing short-range-aids-to-navigation, typically those placed in coastal waters and harbors.

They were built entirely of steel and were originally designed to carry ammunition and cargo from shore to deep-draft vessels anchored off-shore.  These lighters were well suited for a variety of coastal tasks because their hull design incorporated a shallow draft with a solid engineering plant.  All of these  lighters had sufficient cargo space for storing equipment and an open deck and boom for handling large objects.  They proved to be capable and useful buoy tenders.  Each was named for a plant, shrub or tree, prefixed by "White."

Tender history

White Alder was stationed at New Orleans, Louisiana throughout her Coast Guard career, which spanned 1947 until 1968. Her primary assignment was to tend river aids-to-navigation although she was called upon to conduct other traditional Coast Guard duties, such as search and rescue or law enforcement duties, as required.  In mid-November 1965 she escorted raised barge carrying chlorine to a chemical plant and on 4 December 1968 she refloated cutter USCGC Loganberry (WLI-65305), which had been beached on 3 December.

Three of the crew of 20 were rescued, while the other 17 perished. Divers recovered the bodies of three of the dead but river sediment buried the cutter so quickly that continued recovery and salvage operations proved impractical. The Coast Guard decided to leave the remaining 14 crewmen entombed in the sunken cutter, which remains buried in the bottom of the Mississippi River.

The Coast Guard dedicated a memorial, at the Coast Guard base in New Orleans, to the White Alder and her crew on 7 December 1969.  The memorial was moved to the new Coast Guard Group New Orleans offices in Metairie, Louisiana, and rededicated on 6 December 2002.

Sources

 This article contains public domain text from the United States Coats Guard Historian’s Office website.
http://www.uscg.mil/history/WEBCUTTERS/NPS_133_HAER_Report.pdf
 Cutter History File. USCG Historian's Office, USCG HQ, Washington, D.C.
 
 U. S. Department of the Interior. National Park Service. U.S. Coast Guard  Buoy Tenders.  HAER booklet. Washington, DC: National Park Service, February, 2004. [ HAER no. DC-57; Todd Croteau, HAER Industrial Archeologist (project leader); Jet Low, HAER Photographer; Mark Porter, NCSHPO Consultant (historian), and Candace Clifford, booklet design. ]

1943 ships
Maritime incidents in 1968
Ships built in Buffalo, New York
Ships sunk in collisions
Shipwrecks of the Mississippi River
White-class coastal buoy tenders